Koven L. Brown (born June 27, 1951) is an American politician. He is a member of the Alabama House of Representatives from the 40th District, serving since 2010. He is a member of the Republican party.

References

Living people
Republican Party members of the Alabama House of Representatives
1951 births
21st-century American politicians